The 2009 National Hurling League (known as the Allianz National Hurling League for sponsorship reasons) was the 78th season of the National Hurling League.

Structure

The National Hurling League saw a major restructuring of the usual four divisions with the teams divided more equitably into a five-tier structure.

Division 1 was a single division and was confined to the top eight teams. The top two teams in the division qualified for the final. Division 2 operated in a similar manner.

Division 3A was a newly-created division and consisted of six teams. The top two teams in the division qualified for the final. Division 3B operated in a similar manner, however, that division consisted of seven teams.

Division 4 was a single division consisting of six teams. The top two teams in the division qualified for the final.

Division 1

Tipperary came into the season as defending champions of the 2008 season.

On 3 May 2009, Kilkenny won the title after a 4-17 to 2-26 extra-time win over Tipperary. It was their first league title since 2006 and their 14th National League title overall.	

Clare failed to win a single group stage game - finishing in the bottom position - and were relegated to Division 2 for the 2010 league.

Dublin's Alan McCrabbe was the Division 1 top scorer with 1-50.

Structure

A total of 8 teams contested the top division of the league, including all of the sides from the 2008 season that formerly took part in Divisions 1A and 1B. Due to the restructuring the 2008 Division 2 champions did not gain promotion to the top tier.

Each team played all the others in its group once, earning 2 points for a win and 1 for a draw. The first-placed teams in Division 1 contested the final.

Table

Group stage

Knock-out stage

Final

Top scorers

Overall

Single game

Division 2

Table

Group stage

Knock-out stage

Final

Scoring statistics

Top scorers overall

Top scorers in a single game

Division 3A

Final

Kildare won promotion to Division Two for 2010 while Meath remained in Division Three for 2010

Division 3B

Final

London won promotion to Division Three A for 2010 while Roscommon remained in Division Three B for 2010

Division 4

Final

Sligo won promotion to Division Three B for 2010 while Monaghan remained in Division Four for 2010

Promotion and relegation

References

External links

 
National Hurling League seasons